The Little Withlacoochee River is a 16-mile (26 kilometer) long river with its headwaters starting in the Richloam Wildlife Management Area in Sumter County, Florida. The Little Withlacoochee River ends near River Junction Campground just east of Silver Lake in the Croom Wildlife Management Area. It makes up a portion of the Hernando-Sumter County border. Its drainage basin covers 145 mi² (376 km²) of Hernando County and Sumter County.

Course 
The course of the Little Withlacoochee River flows through mostly wilderness, mainly Richloam Wilderness Management Area (WMA), one of seven tracts of the Withlacoochee State Forest. Richloam covers 58,000 acres of pine flatwoods and cypress swamps; over 4 counties: Hernando, Sumter, Pasco, and Lake. Richloam features fishing, hunting, and hiking trails. The exception is a small, undeveloped neighborhood near Ridge Manor. The river empties into the Withlacoochee River in Croom WMA, another tract of the Withlacoochee State Forest. Croom also covers 20,000 acres of pine flatwoods over Hernando and Sumter Counties, as well as Silver Lake. It features a combined 138 miles of biking, hiking, and horse trails.

River crossings

References

Bodies of water of Hernando County, Florida
Bodies of water of Sumter County, Florida
Rivers of Florida